Karl Lewis Triana (born October 7, 1992) is a Colombian professional baseball pitcher who is a free agent.

Triana pitched for the Missoula Osprey of the Rookie-level Pioneer League in 2012. He was promoted to the Hillsboro Hops of the Class A-Short Season Northwest League for the 2013 season, but struggled, and was demoted to Missoula.

In 2016, Triana pitched for the Gary SouthShore RailCats of the American Association of Independent Professional Baseball. During the season, he threw a no-hitter and set the franchise single-season record for strikeouts.

Triana played for the Colombian national baseball team in the 2017 World Baseball Classic. For the 2017 season, Triana played for the Québec Capitales of the Canadian-American Association of Professional Baseball.

References

External links

1992 births
Living people
Arizona League Diamondbacks players
Baseball pitchers
Baseball players at the 2015 Pan American Games
Colombian baseball players
Colombian expatriate baseball players in the United States
Dominican Summer League Diamondbacks players
Colombian expatriate baseball players in the Dominican Republic
Frederick Keys players
Gary SouthShore RailCats players
Hillsboro Hops players
Missoula Osprey players
Sportspeople from Cartagena, Colombia
2017 World Baseball Classic players
Pan American Games competitors for Colombia